Scăești is a commune in Dolj County, Oltenia, Romania with a population of 2,275 people. It is composed of two villages, Scaești and Valea lui Pătru.

References

Communes in Dolj County
Localities in Oltenia